The 1957 Delaware State Hornets football team represented Delaware State College—now known as Delaware State University—as a member of the Central Intercollegiate Athletic Association (CIAA) in the 1957 NCAA College Division football season. Led by coach Bennie J. George in his second season, the Hornets compiled a 6–2 record.

Schedule

References

Delaware State
Delaware State Hornets football seasons
Delaware State Hornets football